The Cantabria tournament is the previous round of the Copa RFEF in Cantabria. Organized by the Cantabrian Football Federation, the Cantabrian teams in Segunda División B and the best teams of the Tercera División (Group 3) not qualified to the Copa del Rey play this tournament, including farm teams.

It is usually played between July and October, and the champion of the tournament qualifies to the National tournament of the Copa RFEF.

Racing de Santander B is the team with most titles.

Format
Since 2014, the tournament is played by the eight best teams that did not qualify to Copa del Rey. It is played by a knockout system with single-game series, and the final is played at Campos de Sport de El Sardinero, in Santander.

The winner receives a €3,000 prize and every team earns €500 per game played.

History

Champions

References

External links
Cantabrian Football Federation

Football in Cantabria
Cantabria